Sven Olof Morgan Andersson (5 April 1910 – 21 September 1987) was a Swedish Social Democratic politician. He served as Minister of Defence from 1957 to 1973, and as Minister for Foreign Affairs from 1973 to 1976. Andersson also served as Minister of Communications (Transport) from 1951 to 1957.

He was during this time as a prominent Social Democratic cabinet minister a strong anti-Communist and defence hawk. He was a key player in the IB affair which became public knowledge in Sweden in 1973.

Andersson was among the editors-in-chief of Stockholms-Tidningen, a social democrat newspaper.

He was awarded the Illis quorum in 1987.

References 

1910 births
1987 deaths
Politicians from Gothenburg
20th-century Swedish politicians
Swedish Ministers for Communications
Swedish Ministers for Defence
Swedish Ministers for Foreign Affairs
Members of the Andra kammaren
Members of the Första kammaren
Members of the Riksdag from the Social Democrats
Swedish anti-communists
Swedish newspaper editors
Recipients of the Illis quorum